M. Zahrul Bin Azhar (born September 5, 1982) is an Indonesian footballer who currently plays for PSPS Pekanbaru in the Indonesia Super League.

Club statistics

References

External links

1982 births
Association football midfielders
Living people
Indonesian footballers
Liga 1 (Indonesia) players
PSPS Pekanbaru players
Indonesian Premier Division players
Persih Tembilahan players